Frank Barnes may refer to:

Frank Barnes (left-handed pitcher) (1900–1967), American baseball pitcher
Frank Barnes (right-handed pitcher) (1926–2014), African American baseball pitcher
Frank Barnes (actor) (1875–?), American actor
Frank Barnes (politician) (1904–1952), Australian politician 
Frank C. Barnes (1918–1992), American lawyer, author and cartridge designer

See also
Honey Barnes (1900–1981), American baseball catcher
Francis Barnes (disambiguation)